The Bradley Transportation Company, was an American shipping company that was a subsidiary of the Michigan Limestone and Chemical Company and handled its shipment of limestone to its parent company U.S. Steel. It boasted a large fleet of self-unloading lakers that were ordered specifically for the company. The Bradley Trans Co. was later merged with the U.S. Steel Great Lakes Fleet during the early 1980s.

Fleet

References

Transportation companies of the United States
U.S. Steel
Transportation companies based in Michigan
Great Lakes Shipping Companies
Limestone industry